Michael George Murphy (born May 5, 1938) is an American film, television and stage actor. He often plays unethical or morally ambiguous characters in positions of authority, including politicians, executives, and lawyers. He is also known for his frequent collaborations with director Robert Altman, having appeared in twelve films, TV series and miniseries directed by Altman from 1963 to 2004, including the title role in the miniseries Tanner '88. He had roles in the films Manhattan, An Unmarried Woman, Nashville,  The Year of Living Dangerously, Phase IV, The Front, Shocker, Magnolia, M*A*S*H and Batman Returns, among others.

Early life
Murphy was born in Los Angeles, California, the son of Georgia Arlyn (née Money), a teacher, and Bearl Branton Murphy, a salesman. After serving in the United States Marine Corps, Murphy attended the University of Arizona and the University of California at Los Angeles (UCLA).

He taught English and drama at University High School (Los Angeles) before pursuing an acting career.

Career
Murphy is best known for his performances as Jill Clayburgh's adulterous husband Martin in Paul Mazursky's An Unmarried Woman (1978), as Woody Allen's morally ambiguous best friend Yale in Manhattan (1979), as ethically enigmatic lawyer Alan Kligman in Magnolia (1999), and as the star of Garry Trudeau and Robert Altman's HBO miniseries Tanner '88.

Murphy worked frequently with Altman, including as Captain Ezekiel Bradbury "Me Lay" Marston, IV, in M*A*S*H (1970), as Frank Shaft in Brewster McCloud (1970), as John Triplette in Nashville (1975), and as the title character in Tanner '88 (a role he reprised in the 2004 miniseries Tanner on Tanner). Other Altman films and television series in which Murphy appeared include the World War II TV series Combat! (in which Murphy appeared in 1963, on the show's second of its five seasons), Countdown (1968), That Cold Day in the Park (1969), McCabe & Mrs. Miller (1971), The Caine Mutiny Court Martial (1988) and Kansas City (1996).

Other notable film roles include The Year of Living Dangerously (1982), Salvador (1986), Silver City (2004), and According to Greta (2009). His television roles include guest appearances on Law & Order, Law & Order: Criminal Intent, L.A. Law and Judging Amy.

Murphy has also narrated many episodes of the PBS historical documentary series The American Experience and the public television travel series Weekends with Yankee. He appeared in Canadian film and television, including This Is Wonderland, for which he won two Gemini Awards, in 2004 and 2005, and was nominated for a third, in 2006. He also appeared in the 2004 Canadian film Childstar.

Personal life
Murphy was married to Canadian actress Wendy Crewson from 1988 until their divorce in January 2009. They have two children, Maggie (born 1989) and John (born 1992).

Murphy currently resides in Cape Elizabeth, Maine.

Selected filmography

 Double Trouble (1967) as Morley
 Countdown (1968) as Rick
 The Legend of Lylah Clare (1968) as Mark Peter Sheean
 That Cold Day in the Park (1969) as The Rounder
 The Arrangement (1969) as Father Draddy
 M*A*S*H (1970) as 'Me Lay' Marston
 The Lawyer (1970) as Intern in Legal Office (uncredited)
 Count Yorga, Vampire (1970) as Paul
 Brewster McCloud (1970) as Det. Lt. Frank Shaft
 McCabe & Mrs. Miller (1971) as Sears
 What's Up, Doc? (1972) as Mr. Smith
 The Thief Who Came to Dinner (1973) as Ted
 The Autobiography of Miss Jane Pittman (1974) as Quentin Lerner
 I Love You... Good-bye (1974) as Alec Shield
 Phase IV (1974) as James R. Lesko
 Nashville (1975) as John Triplette
 The Front (1976) as Alfred Miller
 An Unmarried Woman (1978) as Martin Benton
 The Great Bank Hoax (1978) as Reverend Manigma
 The Class of Miss MacMichael (1978) as Martin
 Manhattan (1979) as Yale
 Strange Behavior (1981) as John Brady
 The Year of Living Dangerously (1982) as Pete Curtis
 Hot Money (1983) as Burt / Tom
 Talk to Me (1984) as Ross
 Cloak & Dagger (1984) as Rice
 My Letter to George (1985) as Wilson
 Salvador (1986) as Ambassador Thomas Kelly 
 The Caine Mutiny Court Martial (1988) as Captain Blakely
 Shocker (1989) as Lt. Don Parker
 Folks! (1992) as Ed
 Batman Returns (1992) as The Mayor
 Clean Slate (1994) as Dr. Doover
 Bad Company (1995) as William V. 'Smitty' Smithfield (uncredited)
 Kansas City (1996) as Henry Stilton
 The Ultimate Lie (1996) as Malcolm McGrath
 Private Parts (1997) as Roger Erlick
 The Island (1998) as John F. Kennedy
 Sleeping Dogs Lie (1998) as Edgar Tratt
 Magnolia (1999) as Alan Kligman Esq.
 The Art of War (2000) as Politician (uncredited)
 Tart (2001) as Mike Storm
 Footsteps (2003) as Robbie
 Tricks (2004) as Arthur
 Silver City (2004) as Senator Judson Pilager
 Childstar (2004) as Reed Harrison
 Heights (2005) as Jesse
 X-Men: The Last Stand (2006) as Warren Worthington II
 Away From Her (2006) as Aubrey
 The Trotsky (2009) as Frank McGovern
 According to Greta (2009) as Joseph
 White House Down (2013) as Vice President Hammond
 They Came Together (2014) as Roger
 Fall (2014) as Father Sam
 Indian Horse (2017) as Father Quinney
 Two Plains & a Fancy (2018) as Rancher

References

External links

1938 births
20th-century American male actors
21st-century American male actors
American male film actors
American male television actors
Best Supporting Actor in a Drama Series Canadian Screen Award winners
Living people
Male actors from Los Angeles
People from Cape Elizabeth, Maine
University of California, Los Angeles alumni
United States Marines
University of Arizona alumni